Raúl Caneda Pérez (born 21 January 1969) is a Spanish football manager.

Caneda holds both the UEFA Pro and UEFA "A" coaching licenses and has coached a number of professional football teams across the world Including Real Sociedad and UD Almería. His brother David is also a football manager.

Managerial career 
In February 2012, Saudi Arabian club Al Ittihad announced that Raúl Caneda had joined the club on an 18 months contract This was announced after the sacking of Slovenian manager Matjaz Kek. The club hired Caneda based on the fact that they thought he had a similar philosophy to that of Barcelona FC manager Pep Guardiola, with Caneda having worked closely with him throughout his career. Guardiola wrote about him, in the preface of the book about Deportivo La Coruña's former player Fran, as being:"a privileged football mind I've had the pleasure to learn from".

Caneda arrived at the Asia giant after four consecutive 2-0 defeats . He made his debut with a brilliant 4-0 in the first game of Asia Champions League against Uzbekistan team Pakhtakor on 3 March 2012 .After that, Al Ittihad was the best team in the group stage of all 32 teams of Asia Champions League with five victories and only one draw.
After beating Iran champion Persepolis in 8th finals, Al Ittihad met the millionaire Chinese team Guanzhou Evergrande, which had made the highest investment ever in ACL, hiring both important players as Dario Conca and the world champions coach Marcelo Lippi. Despite the amazing Chinese investment, Al Ittihad was able to beat them with a 4-2 victory at home and a 2-1 in China.
In semifinals, Al Ittihad had to fight against its local rival Al Ahli Jedahh. The first leg ended with Al Ittihad's victory by 1-0 with one goal by Naif Hazazi. In the middle of a great financial crisis Al Ittihad had lost their Brazilian star Diego Souza in the week previous to the second leg due to repeated non payments. Al Ittihad lost the second leg by 2-0 and their coach lost his unbeaten record of victories for seven months in a row, from March to November, since the first match in charge of the team. Caneda became, in this way, the owner of the largest series, 25 matches, without ever losing with one single coach in the whole history of the club which give to him a big reputation among Al Ittihad fans.

After being eliminated in Asia semifinal, Al Ittihad continued their huge financial and institutional crisis causing the break of the Spanish coach's contract on 23 February in spite of his long term contract. The huge financial and sport crisis continued with the dismissal of historic players such as Hamad Al Monstashari, Mohanmed Noor, Reda Tuker or Mabrouk Zaid one month after Caneda's departure.
In May  2014 it was announced by other Saudi giant Al Nassr as the new head coach. After 13 official games with 12 victories and only one defeat with the team in the first position in the league and above all, making a brilliant football, Raúl Caneda finished his contract with the club due a total absence of payments since the start of the season.However, one year after Al Nassr chairman have to ask for Raúl Caneda again in substitution of Fabio Cannavaro due to big pressure did it for the fans and key players. They achieve to play the  King cup final against Al Ahli Jedahh losing in extra time 2-1.

Coaching career 
In 2006 Raúl Caneda Pérez joined Mexican club Dorados de Sinaloa where he spent a year as a first team coach working alongside fellow Spaniard Juan Manuel Lillo.

In 2008, he moved to San Sebastian to join historic Spanish team Real Sociedad as first team coach for almost two seasons working alongside fellow Juan Manuel Lillo as manager.

In late 2009 Caneda was invited to accompany Juan Manuel Lillo yet again when he was offered the managerial role at UD Almería after the dismissal of Hugo Sanchez. In the first season Lillo and Caneda managed the Andalusians to a 13th-place finish even after beginning the job one place above the relegation zone. Success did not continue however and Caneda moved on after the sacking of Lillo at the end of the 2010-11 season.

Books 
Raúl Caneda wrote the book 'La zona en el futbol" ("The Area in Football"). The book contains foreword by the famous Argentinian player Jorge Valdano, Caneda's former colleague Juan Manuel Lillo and Víctor Fernández. His book was published in 1999 by sports editorial group Wanceulen.

Other Positions within Football 
Between 2002 and 2003 he was the Youth Co-ordinator for Real Madrid Football School in Galicia.

Other positions Caneda has held include; Director of first International Congress of Football in 2004 and Director of second International Congress of Football in 2005.

Also in 2005 Caneda became the Founder and Academic Co-ordinator of the Postgraduate Training Course in football offered by the UAB (Autonomous University of Barcelona).

References 

1969 births
Living people
Spanish football managers
Ittihad FC managers
Al Nassr FC managers
Spanish expatriate football managers
Expatriate football managers in Saudi Arabia
Spanish expatriates in Saudi Arabia
Real Sociedad non-playing staff
Saudi Professional League managers